Herbert Brean (December 10, 1907 – May 7, 1973) was an American journalist and crime fiction writer, best known for his recurring series characters William Deacon and Reynold Frame. He was a director and former executive vice president of the Mystery Writers of America, a group for which he also taught a class in mystery writing. Aside from his seven mystery crime novels, he also published non-fiction books and articles, and mystery magazine short stories. Alfred Hitchcock used "A Case of Identity" (1953), one of Brean's many articles for Life, as the basis for Hitchcock's film The Wrong Man (1957).

As a lifelong Sherlock Holmes fan, Brean was a member of The Baker Street Irregulars, and as such he wrote the introduction to at least one Holmes edition.

Novels

References 

1907 births
20th-century American novelists
20th-century American male writers
American male novelists
American mystery writers
1973 deaths
American male short story writers
20th-century American short story writers